Kye Allums (born October 23, 1989) is a former college basketball player for the George Washington University women's team who in 2010 came out as a trans man, becoming the first openly transgender NCAA Division I college athlete. Allums is a transgender advocate, public speaker, artist, and mentor to LGBT youth.

Personal life 
Allums graduated from Centennial High School in Circle Pines, Minnesota, United States. He played three seasons as a guard on the women's basketball team at George Washington University, the George Washington Colonials.  Allums's teammates called him "Kay-Kay". Allums began telling people to call him "Kye". He came out as a trans man in 2010. He told sports website Outsports, "my biological sex is female, which makes me a transgender male."

In May 2011, GWU announced that Allums had decided to leave the GWU basketball team. He graduated from George Washington University in 2011 with a bachelor's degree in Fine Arts.

In 2014, in an interview with ESPN, Allums said that he had attempted suicide.

George Washington statistics

Advocacy 
Allums began traveling around the country to talk about life as a transgender person. He visits high schools, colleges and universities to discuss the transgender community and how it is possible to  be transgender and play on a team. He gives advice on confronting bullies when being trans.

He starred in Laverne Cox’s documentary The T Word. The film follows young transgender individuals and explains what they go through.

Allums produced a project called "I Am Enough", which encourages other LGBTQ individuals to come out and talk about their experiences. The project allows individuals to submit their stories, thereby showing people who share the same issues that they are not alone. 

In 2015, he was inducted into the National Gay and Lesbian Sports Hall of Fame.

Published work 
Allums published a book called Who Am I?, which features poems and letters he wrote about his parents and himself.

References

External links
 GW Transgender Player Deals With Wave of Publicity, AP
 
  (archived)

1989 births
Living people
African-American basketball players
George Washington Colonials women's basketball players
LGBT African Americans
American LGBT sportspeople
Sex segregation
Transgender sportsmen
LGBT basketball players
LGBT people from Minnesota
Basketball players from Minnesota
People from Circle Pines, Minnesota
Inductees of the National Gay and Lesbian Sports Hall of Fame